Bartonella bacilliformis is a bacterium, Gram negative aerobic, pleomorphic, flagellated, motile, coccobacillary, 2–3 μm long, 0.2–0.5 μm wide, and a facultative intracellular bacterium.

History
The bacterium was discovered by Peruvian microbiologist Alberto Barton in 1905, but it was not published until 1909. Barton originally identified them as endoglobular structures, which actually were the bacteria living inside red blood cells. Until 1993, the genus Bartonella contained only one species; there are now more than 23 identified species, all of them within family Bartonellaceae.

Epidemiology
Bartonella bacilliformis is found only in Peru, Ecuador, and Colombia and some areas of south Florida . It is endemic in some areas of Peru, with outbreaks of the disease occurring in new epidemic areas.  The bacterium is transmitted by sandflies of the genus Lutzomyia.

Microbiology
For its isolation, special cultures are required, containing complemental soy agar, proteases, peptones, some essential amino acids, and blood. The optimum growing temperature is 19–29 °C. Colonies grow in Columbia blood agar supplemented with 10% defibrinated bovine blood incubated at 19–25 °C for 2 weeks.

Pathophysiology
As the sandflies bite, the bacteria are inoculated into the capillaries, where in a variable period of time (around 21 days) it invades the red blood cells producing severe intravascular hemolytic anemia (acute phase of Carrion's disease). This phase is a potentially life-threatening infection, and it is associated with high fever, anemia, and transient immunosuppression. The acute phase typically lasts two to four weeks. Peripheral blood smears show anisomacrocytosis with many coccobacilli adhered to red blood cells. Thrombocytopenia is also seen and can be severe. Neurological involvement is sometimes seen (neurobartonellosis) and the prognosis in this case is poor. The most feared complications are super-infections, mainly by enterobacteria such as Salmonella, or parasites such as Toxoplasma gondii and Pneumocystis.

When the bacterium invades endothelial cells, it produces the chronic manifestation of the disease known as verruga peruana. This phase consists of a benign skin eruption with raised, reddish-purple nodules (angiomatous tumours). Visualization of the bacteria is possible using  silver stain (the Warthin–Starry method) on biopsies.

Disease
Bartonella bacilliformis is the etiologic agent of Carrion's disease or Oroya fever (acute phase of infection), and verruga peruana or Peruvian wart (chronic phase of infection). The acute phase of the disease is a life-threatening disease characterized by massive invasion of Bartonella to human red blood cells and consequently acute hemolysis and fever. If the infection is not treated, the case fatality rate is 40 to 85% Patients in this phase of the infection can be complicated by overwhelming infections, primarily by enterobacteria (Salmonella spp) and parasites (Toxoplasma gondii, Pneumocystis jirovecii).
The chronic phase is characterized by benign eruptive lesions that are pruritic and bleeding, and other symptoms like malaise and osteoarticular pain. Bartonella can be isolated from blood cultures and secretion of the lesions in people from endemic areas.

Treatment
Before the antibiotic era, the only treatment for the acute phase was blood transfusion, but the effectiveness of this treatment was poor and the mortality rate was high. Later, with the discovering of new antibiotics, penicillin, chloramphenicol, tetracycline, and erythromycin have been used successfully. However, because of the risk of overwhelming infections by enterobacteria, quinolones are preferred. Therapeutic failures and persistent bacteremia have been reported with chloramphenicol, and successful treatment with this drug does not appear to eliminate the patient's risk for development of the eruptive phase. So, the drug of choice is ciprofloxacin.

In the chronic phase, the treatment used traditionally has been streptomycin for 10 days. Since 1975, rifampin has become the drug of choice for verruga peruana. However, failures of rifampin treatment have also been reported and resistance can develop. Recently macrolides have been used with similar effectiveness.

References

External links
 Human Bartonellosis caused by Bartonella bacilliformis
 Bartonella bacilliformis in the NCBI Taxonomy Browser

Bartonellaceae
Bacteria described in 1913